Sakhi Ke Biyah ( Friends's marriage) is a 2019 Indian Bhojpuri-language action drama film directed by Nand Kishore Mahto and produced by Pawan Kumar Mahto under the banner: Royal Films Entertainment. The film stars Bhojpuri-singer Sunil Sagar and Rani Chatterjee in the lead with Gopal Rai, Brijesh Tripathi and Maya Yadav cast in the supporting roles. It was initially slated to be released on 4 May 2018 but that didn't occur.

Rani Chatterjee was paid fees of about 5-8 lakhs for her role. The film was shot in village Nagthale near Goa highway.

Plot

Cast
 Rani Chatterjee as Saloni
 Sunil Sagar as Rohit
 Gopal Rai
 Brijesh Tripathi
 Maya Yadav

Promotion
Official trailer of the film was released on 8 March 2018 on the YouTube channel: Worldwide Records Bhojpuri.

Music
The lead song Koyla Khani Jarat Jawani featuring foot-tapping music was released on 24 April 2018 followed by Chand Utral Ba Angnaiya, Peer Jiya Ke Ka Batlayin, and Aawa Taare Dulha Daamad on 1, 7 and 10 May 2018, respectively, on the same YouTube channel the official trailer was unveiled.

See also
 Sasura Bada Paisawala
 Devra Bada Satawela

References

External links

2010s Bhojpuri-language films
Films released on YouTube
Indian action drama films